Gunnar Thomas Hoglund (born December 17, 1999) is an American professional baseball pitcher in the Oakland Athletics organization. Hoglund played college baseball for the Ole Miss Rebels.

Amateur career
Hoglund graduated from Dayspring Academy in Port Richey, Florida, but since they do not offer any athletic teams, he played baseball for Fivay High School in Hudson, Florida. As a senior in 2018, he had a 7–0 win–loss record with a 0.27 earned run average (ERA). He was selected 36th overall by the Pittsburgh Pirates in the 2018 Major League Baseball draft, but did not sign and instead chose to enroll at the University of Mississippi and play college baseball for the Ole Miss Rebels. 

In 2019, Hoglund's freshman year at Ole Miss, he appeared in 17 games (with 16 games started), going 3–3 with a 5.29 ERA, striking out 53 and walking 14 in 68 innings pitched. As a sophomore in 2020, he went 3–0 with a 1.16 ERA and 37 strikeouts over  innings before the season was ended due to the COVID-19 pandemic. On May 11, 2021, it was announced that Hoglund would require Tommy John surgery, thus ending his junior season prematurely. Over 11 starts, he pitched  innings, striking out 96 batters while going 4–2 with a 2.87 ERA.

Professional career
The Toronto Blue Jays selected Hoglund in the first round, with the 19th overall selection, in the 2021 Major League Baseball draft. He signed with the Blue Jays for a $3.2 million signing bonus, forgoing his senior year of college baseball.

On March 16, 2022, the Blue Jays traded Hoglund, Kevin Smith, Zach Logue, and Kirby Snead to the Oakland Athletics for Matt Chapman. Hoglund made his professional debut in mid-July while on a rehab start with the Arizona Complex League Athletics before being assigned to the Stockton Ports after two games.

References

External links

1999 births
Living people
Baseball pitchers
Ole Miss Rebels baseball players
People from Dunedin, Florida
Baseball players from Florida
Arizona Complex League Athletics players
Stockton Ports players